The expression "top dog" is an idiom for the boss or the leader. In a competition, it is also the favorite or the one expected to win, and the opposite of the underdog. It may be a shorthand reference for a dominance hierarchy.

Top Dog may also refer to: 
 Top Dog (comics), a comic book character from Top Dog series by Star Comics (a Marvel Comics imprint)
 The Top Dog, a 1918 British film
 Top Dog (1995 film), a 1995 action film with Chuck Norris
 Top Dog (2014 film), a 2014 crime film with Leo Gregory
 Top Dog (rapper), member of the hip hop group O.G.C.
 Top dog, another name for the card game big two
 Top Dawg Entertainment, independent record label
 America's Top Dog, a 2020 American reality series
 Top Dog (2020 TV series), a Swedish crime drama

See also
 Top Cat (disambiguation)